Tabory may refer to:
Tabory, Poland, a village in Pomeranian Voivodeship, Poland.
Tabory, Russia, name of several rural localities in Russia.
Tabory, Ukraine, a village in Baranovskiy district, Zhytomyr Oblast, Ukraine.